The Australian Health Protection Principal Committee (AHPPC) is the peak decision-making committee for public health emergency management and disease control in the Commonwealth of Australia. It is chaired by the Chief Medical Officer of the Australian Government and comprises the chief health officers of the states and territories.

The AHPPC's stated function (according to website ) is to provide advice to the Australian Health Ministers' Advisory Council (AHMAC) "on health protection matters and national priorities", and AHMAC formerly supported the Council of Australian Governments (COAG) Health Council. However, since the COVID-19 pandemic in Australia, the AHPPC has provided advice directly to the National Cabinet.

History and role
The AHPPC was established by the Australian Health Ministers’ Advisory Council (AHMAC) on 2 July 2009 to provide expert advice on high-level and intergovernmental coordination of public health emergency management. The AHPPC is tasked with providing advice on health protection in the context of emerging health threats, infectious disease, environmental health, and natural disasters. The AHPPC also collaborates with state and territory governments to develop consistency and standards for national health protection.

The AHPPC is also responsible for authorising the deployment of the Australian Medical Assistance Team (AUSMAT).

COVID-19 pandemic
In response to the ongoing COVID-19 pandemic, the AHPPC has provided expert advice to the National Security Committee, the Cabinet of Australia, and the National Cabinet of Australia. The National COVID-19 Health and Research Advisory Committee was established in April 2020 to provide advice on Australia’s health response to the COVID-19 pandemic to the Commonwealth Chief Medical Officer and the AHPPC.

Membership
The AHPPC is chaired by the Chief Medical Officer of the Australian Government and  comprises the Chief Health Officers of the State and Territory Governments. It previously included (as of at least 2017) nominated health disaster officials, the chairs of the AHPPC standing committees, a representative from Emergency Management Australia of the Department of Home Affairs, the Surgeon-General of the Australian Defence Force, a representative from the New Zealand Ministry of Health, and other public health and clinical experts.

As of 2017 it also included:

Standing committee oversight
The AHPPC also provides strategic direction and support to five standing committees:
Communicable Diseases Network Australia (CDNA)
National Health Emergency Management Standing Committee (NHEMS)
Public Health Laboratory Network (PHLN)
Environmental Health Standing Committee (enHealth)
Blood Borne Viruses and Sexually Transmitted Infections Standing Committee (BBVSS)

 it also oversees one time-limited advisory group, the Aged Care Advisory Group.

Secretariat
The Office of Health Protection of the Department of Health provides secretariat support functions for the AHPPC and its standing committees.

See also
 National COVID-19 Coordination Commission
 National Cabinet of Australia
 Council of Australian Governments
 National Security Committee
 War Cabinet of Australia

References

Government of Australia
 
Public policy in Australia